You Mean Everything to Me may refer to:
"You Mean Everything to Me" (song), a song by Neil Sedaka
"You Mean Everything to Me", a song by Curtis Mayfield
"You Mean Everything to Me", a song by Black Ivory
"You Mean Everything to Me", a song by Shawn Mullins